X Factor Adria, usually referred simply as X Faktor, was a Balkan production of international talent show franchise of The X Factor. The Adria edition of the show covered Serbia, Montenegro, Bosnia and Herzegovina, Macedonia and as of Season 2 Croatia as well, making the show regional. The 2nd Season was hosted by Antonija Blaće, Aleksandar Radojičić and Snezana Velkov. Like the original British version of the show, X Factor Adria was a music competition to find new singing talent, contested by aspiring singers drawn from public auditions.

Format

Stages
The show consists of several phases: auditions, bootcamp, judge's houses and live shows. During the auditions and bootcamp phases of the competition, judges as a group decide on the fate of the contestants with a majority vote. After the bootcamp, acts are split into four different groups and one of the judges is assigned to mentor each of the acts in the group. During the judge's houses stage, judges are accompanied with guest judges and they choose the acts from their category who they want to take to the live shows. Live shows are the final stage of the competition and the first stage where public get their say by voting to keep their favourite in and eventually win.

Auditions
The first part of the selection process are the auditions. Potential contestants apply for a place at the auditions either online or via text message. Those invited to the auditions perform in front of the producers before some are selected to audition in front of the judges. Producers' auditions are sometimes referred to as pre-auditions.

The first series also featured a mobile video booth where people could audition without previously applying. The booth was set up on the grounds of Petrovaradin Fortress during the Exit festival.

After the pre-auditions, producers call back the acts they want to perform in front of the judges. The judges auditions are the first part of the series that is broadcast. During the auditions, acts introduce themselves and perform in front of the judges. After an act performs, the judges give feedback and vote. Acts need three or four "yes" responses from the judges to get through to the next stage of the competition - Bootcamp.

Bootcamp
Bootcamp is the second stage where the acts who made it through are called back to perform again. In bootcamp acts can sometimes face challenges such as performing with other acts, choreography, and sing-offs. Judges as a group select 24 acts (6 of each category) to progress to judges houses. Sometimes, when judges and producers feel like there is a lack of good groups, a group can be formed of the solo acts that didn't make it through in their own category. After each of the category is formed, a judge is assigned as mentor to the category.

Judge's houses
The acts who have been selected in bootcamp perform in front of a single judge one more time. That judge is usually accompanied with a guest judge who is there to help him/her make the decision of selecting the acts who will represent him and the category in the live shows. Even though the phase is called judge's houses, it's rare for the judges to have acts perform in their actual houses - usually a location is booked by the producers.

Live shows
The live shows are the final stage of the competition. In this phase acts perform live in front of an audience and the public votes for their favourite. Each week has a different theme. After all the acts perform and the public votes have been counted, the safe acts are announced - leaving two acts in "the bottom two". The bottom two perform one more time and the judges vote on the act they want to save or send home. The saved/eliminated act is decided by majority vote - in case the judges tie the vote the act who leaves the competition is decided by the public votes that were counted earlier. In the final judges have no say as the winner is decided solely on the public vote.

Categories
According to the show producers, the first series will feature four categories: Girls, Boys, Groups and "Second chance" category. The Second chance category includes contestants who are over 30 years old and contestants who previously took part in other talent shows. When the show started broadcasting, the producers decided to drop the "Second chance" category and went with "Over 27s".

Judges and presenters

The first series was judged by Emina Jahović, Kristina Kovač, Kiki Lesendrić, and Željko Joksimović. Kristina and Željko were the first to be announced, while Emina and Kiki were announced a day later. All of the judges are singers and songwriters, and some of them are also composers and producers.

After the first two episodes were aired, a rumor started that Bane Jevtić was going to be replaced after hosting only first 8 episodes, but the producers released a statement saying that the rumors weren't true. On the night of the first live show it was reported that a new host was going to replace Bane, keeping in secret who it was going to be. It was revealed that Slavko Kalezić would take the role of the host. The day after the first live show it was announced that Slavko would be replaced as well. Finally, Slavko was replaced by Ana Grubin who hosted the show since the second live show.

Shortly after the first series, Željko announced that he wouldn't take part in the second series. After the production of the show was taken by the new company it wasn't sure if any of the previous judges would stay. Inclusion of Croatia sparked rumors that some of the singers originating from that country would be included in the judging panel for the second series. Some of the artists that were rumored to have been offered a judging role for the second series included Severina, Jelena Rozga, Dino Merlin, Vlado Georgiev, Gibonni, Đorđe Balasević, and Zdravko Čolić.

In February 2015, it was announced that judges of the second season of X Factor Adria would be Željko Joksimović, Tonči Huljić, Massimo Savić, and Aleksandra Kovač. Shortly after, it was confirmed that Antonija Blaće was going to host the show alongside Aleksandar Radojčić. Snežana Velkov was to host the show as well, making her the only returning host from the first season.

Guests

Season 1
Guest judges at the judge's houses were Toni Cetinski at Željko's house, Leontina Vukomanović at Kristina's house, Mustafa Sandal at Emina's house and Scott Mills at Kiki's house. Guests at the live shows were 2Cellos, Hari Varešanović, Jelena Tomašević, Doris Dragović, Jelena Rozga, Loreen, Kaliopi, Tropico Band, Dejan Cukić, Parni Valjak, Nataša Bekvalac and Ana Stanić. Super Finals guests were: Marija Šerifović, Tijana Dapčević, Piloti and Madlick.

Season 2
Guest judges at the judge's houses were Nina Badric at Masimo's house and Mirko Vukomanović at Željko's house, Kaliopi at Aleksandra's house and Petar Grašo at Tonči's house. Guests at the live shows were Måns Zelmerlöw, Roma Sijam, Lana Jurčević, Magazin, Elena Risteska, S.A.R.S., Knez, Petar Grašo, Vanna, Saša Kovačević, Karolina Gočeva, Lukijan Ivanović, Jacques Houdek, Slavko Kalezić, Vlaho Arbulić, James Arthur, Jelena Rozga.

Series
To date, both series have finished broadcasting, as summarised below.

 Contestant in (or mentor of) "Boys" category
 Contestant in (or mentor of) "Girls" category
 Contestant in (or mentor of) "Over 27s" category
 Contestant in (or mentor of) "Groups" category

Judges' categories and their contestants
In each season, each judge is allocated a category to mentor and chooses three acts to progress to the live shows. This table shows, for each season, which category each judge was allocated and which acts he or she put through to the live shows.

Key:
 – Winning judge/category. Winners are in bold, eliminated contestants in small font.

Awards and recognitions
Golden Ladybug of Popularity (Skopje, Macedonia) – Award for best regional TV project, 2014
Golden Ladybug of Popularity (Skopje, Macedonia) – Discovery of the year Award for Daniel Kajmakoski, 2014

See also
Prvi glas Srbije
Operacija Trijumf
Idol (Serbian-Montenegrin and Macedonian TV series)
Hrvatska traži zvijezdu
Hrvatski Idol

References 

Adria
Serbian talent shows
Television series by Fremantle (company)
2010s Serbian television series
2013 Serbian television series debuts
2015 Serbian television series endings
Non-British television series based on British television series
RTV Pink original programming